The Summer Wind Blows (Swedish: Ute blåser sommarvind) is a 1955 Swedish drama film directed by Åke Ohberg and starring Lars Nordrum, Margit Carlqvist and Edvin Adolphson. It was shot at the Sundbyberg Studios in Stockholm and on location in Oslo. The film's sets were designed by the art director Bibi Lindström.

Synopsis
A Norwegian employee of an insurance company quits his job in Oslo and heads to Sweden. There he encounters two very different women both of whom appeal to him.

Cast
 Lars Nordrum as 	Claus Aare
 Margit Carlqvist as 	Liss Strömberg
 Edvin Adolphson as 	Tore Andersson
 Sigge Fürst as 	'Salta Biten'
 Douglas Håge as 	Station master
 Peter Lindgren as Gustav-Adolf Hållman
 Randi Kolstad as 	Eivor
 Elof Ahrle as 	Sverre
 Lillebil Kjellén as 	Mrs. Lindgren
 Kerstin Palo as 	Ingrid
 Sigrun Otto as 	Claus' Mother
 Rolf Christensen as Kristian Aare
 Karl-Ludvig Bugge as 	Lindgren
 Kari Diesen as 	Woman at balcony
 Karin Hox as 	Young secretary
 John Melin as 	Merchant Johansson
 Fridtjof Mjøen as 	Engineer
 Arvid Nilssen as 	En gift mann
 Eugen Skjønberg as 	Arbeidsformannen

References

Bibliography 
 Qvist, Per Olov & von Bagh, Peter. Guide to the Cinema of Sweden and Finland. Greenwood Publishing Group, 2000.

External links 
 

1955 films
Swedish drama films
1955 drama films
1950s Swedish-language films
Films directed by Åke Ohberg
Swedish black-and-white films
Films based on Norwegian novels
Films shot in Norway
1950s Swedish films